The 2017–18 NIFL Championship was the second season of the second-tier Irish League since gaining senior status.

Teams
The 2017–18 NIFL Championship was contested by 12 teams. Warrenpoint Town were champions in the previous season and were promoted to the 2017–18 NIFL Premiership. Runners-up Institute won 3–2 on aggregate in the promotion pre-play-off against third-placed Ballyclare Comrades, but were defeated 5–2 on aggregate by Carrick Rangers in the Premiership play-off, therefore remaining in the Championship for this season.

The bottom team from the previous season, Annagh United, were relegated to the third-tier NIFL Premier Intermediate League. They were replaced by Limavady United, winners of the Premier Intermediate League. In addition, the eleventh-placed team from the previous season, Armagh City, were relegated and replaced by third-tier runners-up Newry City, against whom they lost a two-legged play-off.

Stadia and locations

League table

Results

Matches 1–22
During matches 1–22 each team played every other team twice (home and away).

Matches 23–32
During matches 23–32 each team played every other team in their half of the table twice (home and away).

Top six

Bottom six

Play-offs

NIFL Premiership play-offs
The runners-up and third-placed teams from the Championship were set to take part (over two legs) in the Championship promotion pre-play-off. However, the third-placed team, Harland and Wolff Welders, did not apply for a Premiership licence, so the second-placed team Newry City moved directly into the play-off final.

NIFL Championship play-off
The eleventh-placed team from the Championship, Dergview, played the runners-up from the 2017–18 Premier Intermediate League, Queen's University, over two legs for one spot in the NIFL Championship.

Dergiew won 4–1 on aggregate and retained their position in the NIFL Championship with Queen's University remaining in the NIFL Premier Intermediate League.

References

External links

NIFL Championship seasons
Northern Ireland
2017–18 in Northern Ireland association football